Rudra Shumsher Jung Bahadur Rana was an erstwhile field-marshal and the Western Commander-in-Chief of Nepal. He was in line to be the Prime Minister of Nepal, when he was exiled to the Palpa District, where he was made the district's Tainathwalla (chief administrative official). He held this position from 1934 till 1951 and was the last Tainathwalla ever appointed in the Palpa District.

See also
 List of field marshals in Nepal

References

Field marshals
Nepalese exiles
Children of prime ministers of Nepal